HiQ is a nationwide British retailer of automobile tyres, and MoT car-servicing centres.

History
The company was created in July 1992 as HiQ Tyreservices by Goodyear Tire and Rubber Company.

It was the main sponsor of the British Touring Car Championship (BTCC) in 2008, 2009 and 2014. It supplies the tyres exclusively for the British police.

The companies' outlets were improved in 2008.

Structure
It has around 100 service centres across the UK. The company headquarters are at Trident Court on the 148-acre Birmingham Business Park, around a half-mile south-west of junction 4 of the M6, accessed from the A452. This is also the headquarters of Dunlop Tyres UK, which moved to the site in May 2017.

Training
Technicians are trained at the HiQ Training Academy. The company would like all of its employees to have the Automotive Technician Accreditation (ATA) qualification.

See also
 ATS Euromaster, also in Birmingham
 List of tire companies

References

External links
Official Website
HiQ Franchise
Repair Of Injectors

Automotive companies of the United Kingdom
Automotive repair shops
British companies established in 1992
Retail companies established in 1992
Companies based in Solihull
Franchises
Goodyear Tire and Rubber Company